Pezë is a former municipality in the Tirana County, central Albania. At the 2015 local government reform it became a subdivision of the municipality Tirana. The population at the 2011 census was 6,272. Peza was the headquarters of the National Liberation Movement of Albania.

References

Former municipalities in Tirana County
Administrative units of Tirana